Travelling Light is a 1959 British naturist pseudo-documentary from Edward Craven Walker. He made it to show it to clubs and people in the hope of persuading them to join ‘Naturist way of life’ he loved. It premiered in London's West End.

The film stars Elizabeth Walker, who was routinely described as Naturism’s Ambassador in 1950s Britain. In the movie Elizabeth, while sunbathing at Studland Bay gets invited to join some naturists on a trip to the famous nudist colony at Villata in Corsica. There, they meet Yannick, who performs a unique “underwater ballet”. At the end of her holiday, Elizabeth returns home refreshed and with a newfound enthusiasm for naturism.

References

External links
Travelling Light at Docmasters
Extract of film at YouTube

British documentary films
Nudity in film